Colliculus (Latin for "mound") can refer to:

Anatomy

Midbrain
 Inferior colliculus, the principal midbrain nucleus of the auditory pathway
 Superior colliculus, a paired structure that forms a major component of the vertebrate midbrain
 Collicular arteries, which supply portions of the midbrain

Ankle
 Anterior colliculus, of the medial malleolus
 Posterior colliculus, of the medial malleolus

Other locations
 Seminal colliculus, a landmark near the entrance of the seminal vesicles
 Facial colliculus, an elevated area located on the dorsal pons